Line 5 is a north–south rapid transit line of the Shanghai Metro network, running from  station in Minhang District in the north to  in Fengxian District was originally planned as the Minhang and Fengxian sections of line 1 extending south to Minhang. Despite its numeric designation, it was the fourth Shanghai Metro line to enter passenger service, opening on 25 November 2003. The line is colored violet on system maps.

History 
Line 5 was originally built under the direction of Minhang District and remains the only line in Shanghai Metro system that was originally built under the supervision of a county-level government.

In 1998, Minhang District authorities signed a contract with Shanghai Jiushi Group to build the line. In 2000, Shanghai Jiushi Group signed a contract between Alstom to purchase trains and started its construction. In 2002, Shanghai Modern Rail Transit Incorporated, a subsidiary of former , was given management of the line.

Prior to integration with the rest of the Shanghai Metro network, it used its own ticketing system. In 2005, it was integrated with Shanghai Metro's ticketing system, which enabled an in-station interchange to line 1 at Xinzhuang station. At the same time, management and operation of the line was taken over by Shanghai No. 1 Metro Operation Co. Ltd.

Phase II extension and renovation 
Phase two of the line, which would extend the line further south into Fengxian District, began construction on 30 July 2014. Full service was restored on 20 October 2018. At the same time, the line began to operate as two separate services, being split at  station, due to the anticipated opening of the phase two extension of line 5, which would create two branches of the line. Six-car trains began to run on the service between Xinzhuang and Dongchuan Road station. Passengers wishing to travel the entire length of the line needed to interchange at Dongchuan Road station.

On 30 December 2018, the extension from Dongchuan Road station to  station opened, becoming the first Shanghai Metro line to provide access to Fengxian District. The extension crosses the Huangpu River using the Minpu Second Bridge, the first Shanghai Metro line which crosses the river by bridge. As a result of the extension, the segment of line 5 between Dongchuan Road and Minhang Development Zone stations was designated as a branch service, while the main service ran from Xinzhuang to Fengxian Xincheng stations. The branch line was operated as a separate service from the main line, thus still necessitating a transfer at Dongchuan Road station. This was due to the fact that four-car trains ran on the branch service, while six-car trains ran on the main line. This arrangement ended on 26 December 2020, now service on the branch line continues straight through to Xinzhuang With four-car trains from the branch line and six-car trains from the mainline running in mixed operation in the joint section between Xinzhuang and Dongchuan Road stations. Additionally, the fare system of the line reverted to a pricing similar to other Shanghai Metro Lines.

Controversy
During the trial operation of the southern extension section Shanghai Metro received complaints from residents of Pujiang Building on noise. In order to effectively control the impact of the noise caused by the train operation, on the premise of not affecting the overall capacity of line 5, a speed limit of 20 km/h was implemented between  Station and  Station.

Stations

Service routes

Important stations

Future expansion
There is currently a reserved and unopened station on the phase two extension of the line, which would be named  station, located south of the current terminus at Fengxian Xincheng station. A further expansion of the second phase may see the line extended further south via Nanqiao town, Zhelin town to Haiwan town.

The branch line between Dongchuan Road and Minhang Development Zone stations is expected to be replaced by Line 23, entirely underground, running to Shanghai Indoor Stadium station.

Plans have been abandoned as this extension is now part of the under construction Jiamin line.

Headways 
<onlyinclude>
<onlyinclude>

Technology

Signalling

Between 2014 and 2018 the signalling system of line 5 has been updated from the Siemens ZUB 200 to Thales SEC Transport TSTCBTC®2.0 (also deployed on Line 14). It is a unique dual CBTC system that features full redundancy and allows higher level of availability. This is China's first metro line that was deployed with a dual CBTC system.

Shanghai Metro line 5 is China's first metro line where operation, renovation and construction were fulfilled at the same time. The project consisted of resignaling and expanding platforms of the existing section and adding a new south extension. To ensure no interruption to normal service, all the resignalling and commissioning was conducted in only a few hours during the night. Both before and after the commissioning, a switchover was made between the old and the new signaling system to ensure normal operation on the next day. After over 500 days, and more than 1,000 switchovers, line 5 had a seamless cutover to the new signalling system with no interruption to normal service at the end of 2018.

Rolling stock
In 2017, Alstom has modernised 68 metro cars (05C01) in service on the Shanghai metro line 5 and to supplied traction and train control management systems for 198 new metro cars due to circulate on the existing line and its extension for 46 million euros. Alstom had modernised the 68 metro cars that it supplied in 2003 with its Chinese joint venture SATCO (Shanghai Alstom Transport Co. Ltd.). The modernisation will increase the reliability of the cars and adapt them to a new signalling system that will be implemented on the line. Alstom supplied traction systems for 198 new cars that have been ordered for the line and its extension. All traction drives were manufactured by Alstom's joint venture SATEE (Shanghai Alstom Transport Electrical Equipment Co. Ltd.).

The designed speed of the train is 80 km/h, the length (Type A carriages are longer at 23 meters) is 19.49 meters (Tc)/19.44 meters (Mp, M), and the width (Type A carriages are wider at 3.0 meters) is 2.6 meters. It is a VVVF AC drive and has a design life of 30 years. Set 05C01 has 4 carriages with 172 seats which could accommodate 1170 people (compared to a six carriage Type A car which can accommodate 1860 people which is 60% higher than a four carriage Type C car).

References 

Shanghai Metro lines
 
Railway lines opened in 2003
2003 establishments in China